The Amazing Bulk is a 2012 American independent live-action/animated direct-to-video superhero parody film directed and co-produced by Lewis Schoenbrun, starring Jordan Lawson, Shevaun Kastl, Terence Lording, Juliette Angeli, Jed Rowen and Randal Malone. Despite being initially created as a parody, it was considered to be a mockbuster of the 2008 The Incredible Hulk film, as well as other media featuring the Hulk character. Drawing parallels from the Hulk franchise, the film follows a research scientist who injects himself with an experimental serum, which inadvertently results in him gaining the ability to transform into a giant, purple-skinned humanoid monster whenever he gets angry.

Produced by Laybl Productions and released on April 17, 2012, by Wild Eye Releasing, the film garnered notoriety due to how its settings and visuals are almost entirely all reused stock imagery, graphics, and video purchased from various websites. It was even considered one of the worst films ever made. On April 5, 2021, an Ebook titled The Return of the Amazing Bulk was published on Amazon Prime by Atom Mudman Bezecny, serving as a sequel to the film as it follows Howard as he seeks a cure to return to his normal self while also having to a battle a supervillainess named Pam Demic.

Plot 
Government research scientist Henry "Hank" Howard has been commissioned by General Darwin to develop a serum that will enhance the user's strength and longevity. Howard wishes to marry Darwin's daughter Hannah, but Darwin sternly refuses to give him his blessing, saying he will not be allowed to marry her until he gets results from the serum test. That night, he goes on a date with Hannah to a carnival. They then take the subway, wherein a mugger approaches them at gunpoint and steals Howard's wallet and the ring he plans to propose to Hannah with. Not wanting to lose the ring, Howard attempts to fight the mugger and loses. After the mugger flees the scene, Hannah expresses her concern for Howard's sudden bravery, asking what could be so important that he would risk his life over. In order to hide the intended proposal, Howard lies, saying the mugger took a flash drive containing secret files about the serum.

In an effort to prove that his serum is effective, Howard injects himself with it, turning him into a giant purple humanoid, the Bulk. Later that night, while witnessing the same mugger assault and murder a young woman, Howard transforms into the Bulk and kills the man; he runs off as police arrive to the scene, and they notice purple blood on the ground. Detectives Ray Garton and Lisa Tuttle find Howard's wallet and return it to him the next day. When Garton finds a purple stain on his hand, he becomes convinced that Howard is responsible for the mugger's death. They watch as Howard returns to the scene of the crime, and when they confront him, he transforms into the Bulk.

The Bulk goes on a rampage throughout the city as the detectives pursue him. During the chase, the Bulk sends cars flying through the air, one of which lands on Tuttle, crushing her to death. Garton, enraged by his partner's death, shoots at the Bulk, who grabs and destroys a news helicopter. The Bulk morphs back into Howard and is arrested by Garton. In prison, Howard is confronted by Garton for inadvertently killing Tuttle. 

Darwin visits Howard and injects him with a sedative and takes him to a secret facility, where he performs some experiments on Howard to analyse the results of the serum. Darwin also informs Howard that he will give him both full permission to marry Hannah and an antidote if he agrees to go as the Bulk and take down a mad scientist named Dr. Werner von Kantlove who has been destroying famous monuments and landmarks and is currently plotting to blow up the moon. Howard is deployed several miles away from Kantlove's castle and after sprinting through several locations, he arrives at his castle. Howard transforms into the Bulk and kills Kantlove, his guards, and his dim-witted wife Lolita Kantlove.  

The Bulk turns back into Howard and calls Darwin that he took down Dr. Kantlove, but Darwin then betrays Howard and reveals that he actually lied about a cure to revert him back to his normal self. Darwin also reveals that he has been receiving the funding for his project from Kantlove, who wanted to use the serum to cure his erectile dysfunction, after the government stopped funding it two years ago, and when Howard proved the serum to be a success, Darwin decided that Kantlove was no longer needed, hence why he sent the Bulk to eliminate him. Darwin declares his plan to use the serum to create a super-human soldier army and sends the military to execute Howard. Howard turns into the Bulk and a lengthy chase ensues, ending with a nuclear bomb being dropped on the Bulk. Hannah comes in and Darwin tells her that Hank died saving the world from Dr. Kantlove. 

That night, Hannah wakes up to discover Howard at her house, having survived the bombing. He reunites with Hannah and proposes to her, with Hannah accepting. Howard tries to warn Hannah about Darwin's true nature, but she doesn't believe him. Darwin sees that Howard has survived, and the two break into a struggle and fall off a balcony, which kills them both. Later, Hannah visits Howard's grave and leaves a rose there. After she leaves, a drunken Garton arrives at the grave. He begins to urinate on it, and the Bulk's fists suddenly strike his head.

Cast
 Jordan Lawson as Henry "Hank" Howard / Bulk: A government research scientist who has been commissioned to develop a serum to increase strength and longevity. When Howard successfully creates the serum, he injects himself with it, causing him to transform into the Bulk, a giant purple humanoid, when angered. He is a parody
 Shevaun Kastl as Hannah Darwin: Howard's girlfriend. 
 Terence Lording as General Darwin: Hannah's father, who is against Howard marrying his daughter. He is the one who commissioned Howard to develop the serum. 
 Randal Malone as Dr. Werner von Kantlove: A villain who has been destroying famous monuments with torpedoes from his castle.
 Juliette Angeli as Lolita Kantlove: Kantlove's wife.
 Jed Rowen as Detective Ray Garton: A detective who pursues Howard and the Bulk. 
 Deirdre V. Lyons as Detective Lisa Tuttle: A detective working alongside Garton.

Production
Director Lewis Schoenbrun was researching stock computer-generated imagery for the production of a low-budget horror mockbuster of Spider-Man, starring a female protagonist. When discussing with a producer the idea of making a comic book film featuring large amounts of green screen, he instead decided to create a parody of the character the Hulk. Schoenbrun stated that he never initially intended to make a bad film, but retroactively considered the film a parody. Many of the characters have blatant parallels with Marvel Comics characters associated with the Hulk mythos; Henry Howard with Bruce Banner, General Darwin with General Ross, and the Bulk with the Hulk.

Scriptwriting for the film was completed over a span of four months, while finding all the CGI elements, along with creating storyboards, occurred over the course of six months. All of the film's settings and transitions, as well as much of its imagery, are stock graphics and backgrounds taken from numerous websites, including eBay, Digital Juice, Inc., and TurboSquid.

The film was financed by director Schoenbrun himself. Shooting the film, which cost $6,000, took place over a period of five days. The entire film was shot on a green screen stage in California. Audio mixing cost $3,000, colour correction cost $1,000, and another $4,000 went towards CGI, software, and the film's composer, among other elements. The film's score, composed by Mark Daniel Dunnett, also features classical music from composers like Beethoven, Strauss, and Tchaikovsky.

As a fan of director Stanley Kubrick, Schoenbrun included numerous references to Kubrick's works throughout the film, including a scene of satellites in space reminiscent of 2001: A Space Odyssey; furthermore, the names of the characters Dr. Werner von Kantlove and his assistant Lolita allude to the Kubrick films Dr. Strangelove and Lolita.

Release
The film was originally released on DVD on April 17, 2012 by Tomcat Films. The film went out of print, but was subsequently rediscovered, repackaged, and released on DVD and digital platforms worldwide by independent label Wild Eye Releasing on May 19, 2015.

Reception
The film has received universally negative reviews, with criticism targeted at its acting, editing, continuity, visual effects, and settings. A staff writer for the website Horror Society found it to be absurd and incomprehensible, saying that "the way the film was shot makes it utterly impossible to follow it the way a film should be followed". Film critic Rob Rector criticized the apparent laziness of the filmmakers, stating that it seems they "stumbled across a bunch of free clipart on the internet and decided to weave it together as a backdrop for the film".

Felix Vasquez Jr. of Cinema Crazed berated the film's effects and designs, remarking that the filmmakers may well have "whipped together a movie out of Windows 95 clip art, Microsoft Paint, an old HD camera someone owned, and a lot of green screens in under a week at the director's loft somewhere in California". James DePaolo of the website WickedChannel called it "The Room of superhero movies" and wrote that it "is quite possibly one of the best worst films ever made". Andrea Beach of Common Sense Media gave the film one out of five stars, summarizing it thus: "Lowbrow, violent superhero spoof is just plain bad."

In response to the criticisms, director Schoenbrun has stated that the film is supposed to belong in the same vein as films like Who Framed Roger Rabbit, and that most critics "just don't get the concept of live action people in a comic book world". He also responded to a video criticizing the movie made by YouTuber I Hate Everything, telling the creator "I welcome all comments good & bad!" and that his reviews "give independent films exposure which they so desperately need." I Hate Everything responded, thanking Schoenbrun for being a good sport.

References

External links
 
 

2012 films
2012 direct-to-video films
American superhero films
Mockbuster films
American independent films
2010s superhero films
2012 independent films
Films directed by Lewis Schoenbrun
Film and television memes
2010s English-language films
2010s American films